Vektor Grafix was a British computer game development company led by John Lewis and Andy Craven. Vektor Grafix was founded by Craven and Danny Gallagher in 1986. Their first release were home ports of the Star Wars arcade games. The Leeds-based company then went on to become a developer of mostly 3D simulation games and was eventually bought by MicroProse in July 1992, becoming their development studio.

Games
 Star Wars (ports, 1987)
 Star Wars: The Empire Strikes Back (ports, 1988)
 Ring Wars (1988)
 Fighter Bomber / Strike Aces (1988)
 Killing Cloud (1991)
 Shuttle: the Space Flight Simulator (1992)
 B-17 Flying Fortress (1992)
 Dogfight (1993)

References

External links
 Interview with Andy Craven from Crash Magazine

MicroProse
Video game companies established in 1986
Defunct video game companies of the United Kingdom
Video game development companies